Black Coffee Blues is a book written by Henry Rollins, comprising writings penned between 1989 and 1991. It is composed of seven parts; "124 Worlds", "Invisible Woman Blues", "Exhaustion Blues", "Black Coffee Blues", "Monster", "61 Dreams" and "I Know You". It was published in 1992 by 2.13.61 Publications, Rollins' own publishing house.

Rollins would go on to release two other books with the title: Black Coffee Blue Part 2: Do I Come Here Often? (1996) and Black Coffee Blue Part 3: Smile, You're Traveling (2000).

Album
In 1997, it was released as a spoken word double album with author Henry Rollins narrating with acoustic guitar accompaniment by Chris Haskett, guitarist of Rollins Band.

Track listings
All tracks written by Chris Haskett and Henry Rollins

Disc 1
 Black Coffee Blues (Brisbane) 13:05
 Black Coffee Blues (Berlin) 9:11
 Black Coffee Blues (New York) 9:14
 Black Coffee Blues (Geneva) 9:10
 Black Coffee Blues (San Francisco) 9:39
 Black Coffee Blues (Georgia) 13:48

Disc 2
 Invisible Woman Blues 5:01
 Monster 20:09
 Exhaustion Blues 13:14
 I Know You 5:09

1992 books
1997 albums
Henry Rollins albums
Spoken word albums by American artists
Thirsty Ear Recordings albums
2.13.61 books